This family tree is about the relatives of the Islamic prophet Muhammad known as a family member of the family of Hashim and the Qurayshs tribe which is ‘Adnani.  Muhammad claimed descent from Ishmael through the Hashim tribe.

Muhammad's Family Tree

 * indicates that the marriage order is disputed
 Note that direct lineage is marked in bold.

Genealogy

Muhammad to Adnan
According to Islamic prophetic tradition, Muhammad was descended from Adnan. Tradition records the genealogy from Adnan to Muhammad comprises 21 generations. The following is the list of chiefs who are said to have ruled the Hejaz and to have been the patrilineal ancestors of Muhammad.

 570 CE – Muhammad
 545 CE – Abdullah
 497 CE –  Shaybah (Abd al-Muttalib)
 464 CE – Hashim
 439 CE – Abd Manaf
 406 CE – Qusayy
 373 CE – Kilab
 340 CE – Murrah
 307 CE – Ka'b
 274 CE – Lu'ayy
 241 CE – Ghalib
 208 CE – Fihr
 175 CE – Malik
 142 CE – An-Nadr (Quraysh)
 109 CE – Kinanah
   76 CE – Khuzaimah
   43 CE – Mudrikah
   10 CE – Ilyas
   23 BCE – Mudar
   56 BCE – Nizar
   89 BCE – Ma'add
 122 BCE – Adnan

Adnan to Isma'il
Various genealogies of Adnan up to Isma'il have been narrated. Adnan was the ancestor of the Adnani Arabs of northern, central and western Arabia and a direct descendant of Isma'il. It is not confirmed how many generations are between them; however, Adnan was fairly close to Isma'il. Isma'il had twelve sons who are said to have become twelve tribal chiefs throughout the regions from Havilah to Shur (from Assyria to the border of Egypt).

Genealogists differ from which son of Isma'il the main line of descent came, either through his eldest son Nabut, or his second son Qedar who was the father of the North Arabian Qedarite tribe that controlled the region between the Persian Gulf and the Sinai Peninsula. Genealogists also differ in the names on the line of descent.

Ibrahim to Adam
It is unclear how many generations are between Ibrahim and Nuh. Nuh's son Sam was the ancestor of the Semitic race.

 Ibrahim
 Ta'rih (Azar)
 Tahur
 Shahru’
 Abraghu
 Falikh
 Abir
 Shalikh
 Arfakshad
 Sam
 Nuh
 Lumik
 Mutu Shalkh
 Akhnukh (Idris)
 Yarid
 Mahla'il
 Qainan
 Anush
 Sheeth
 Adam

Family tree linking Prophets to Shi'ite Imams

Ancestry

See also
 Sayyid, an honorific title denoting people accepted as descendants of Muhammad
 Abraham's family tree
 Descent from Adnan to Muhammad
 Ahl al-Bayt
 Family tree of Ali
 Hashemites
 Idrisid dynasty
 Alaouite dynasty

Notes

References

Family of Muhammad
Hashemite people
Muhammad